Palakollu Assembly constituency is a constituency in West Godavari district of Andhra Pradesh, representing the state legislative assembly in India. It is one of the seven assembly segments of Narasapuram (Lok Sabha constituency), along with Achanta, Narasapuram, Bhimavaram, Undi, Tanuku and Tadepalligudem. Nimmala Rama Naidu is the present MLA of the constituency, who won the 2019 Andhra Pradesh Legislative Assembly election from Telugu Desam Party. , there are a total of 190,125 electors in the constituency.

Mandals 

The three mandals that form the assembly constituency are:

Members of Legislative Assembly

Assembly Elections 1952

Assembly Elections 1955

Assembly Elections 1962

Assembly Elections 1967

Assembly Elections 1972

Assembly Elections 1978

Assembly Elections 1983

Assembly Elections 1985

Assembly Elections 1989

Assembly Elections 1994

Assembly Elections 1999

Assembly Elections 2004

Assembly Elections 2009

Assembly elections 2014

Assembly Elections 2019

See also 
 List of constituencies of the Andhra Pradesh Legislative Assembly

References 

Assembly constituencies of Andhra Pradesh
Politics of Palakollu